The Patterson Creek Cutoff is an abandoned railroad line built by the Baltimore and Ohio Railroad (B&O) in northern West Virginia and Western Maryland, that served trains running on the B&O "West End" line in the Cumberland, Maryland area. The cutoff route ran from McKenzie, Maryland to Patterson Creek, West Virginia, providing a bypass of the B&O rail yard in Cumberland for coal trains moving between Keyser, West Virginia and Brunswick, Maryland.

The B&O opened the double track line in 1904, and it included a tunnel and a bridge, both of which are still in existence. The cutoff was later reduced to single track, and ultimately abandoned in the early 1970s by the Chessie System, successor to the B&O. The rails have been removed from the bridge structure, and a few railroad ties are in an advanced state of decomposition. The line's right-of-way can still be easily distinguished, especially in McKenzie, where there is a large cut and fill.

CSX Transportation, the successor to the Chessie System, continues to operate the main rail line in the McKenzie area as the Mountain Subdivision, and the Cumberland Subdivision in the Patterson Creek area.

References 

 "Mountain Subdivision: Eastern Approach." Northern West Virginia's Railroads. Accessed 2010-08-11.
 mtnsub.org. "The Hard Way to Paw Paw: Patterson Creek, WV." Railfanning the B&O Around Cumberland, MD. Accessed 2010-08-11.

Baltimore and Ohio Railroad lines
Rail infrastructure in Maryland
Rail infrastructure in West Virginia
Railroad cutoffs
1904 establishments in Maryland
1904 establishments in West Virginia
Closed railway lines in the United States